The fifth season of the American mystery drama television series Pretty Little Liars began airing on ABC Family on June 10, 2014. Shooting for the season began on March 24, 2014, and ended on November 20, 2014. The season aired from June 10, 2014, to March 24, 2015.

Like the second season, the season consisted of 25 episodes, including a special holiday-themed episode, instead of a Halloween episode which was written by I. Marlene King and her assistant Kyle Bown and was directed by King. It also contained the 100th episode and the episode was written by showrunner I. Marlene King. The promotional poster was released on May 28, 2014. A second promotional poster was released after the hundredth episode was aired, on July 9, 2014. A third promotional poster was released on January 5, 2015, as a promotion for the second half of the fifth season, which began the day after the release of the poster.

It was announced on June 10, 2014, that Pretty Little Liars was renewed for two additional seasons, making the show ABC Family's longest running original series.

The fifth season garnered positive reviews from critics and averaged 2.01 million viewers an episode, down from the previous season, and a 0.9 demo rating, also down from the previous season. The premiere was watched by 2.72 million viewers, while the finale was watched by 2.65 million viewers.

Overview 
After Aria inadvertently kills the rooftop shooter, revealed to be Shana, the Liars try to adjust to the new world in which 'A' is presumably dead and Alison is very much alive, while still trying to keep up with Ali's new lie about her whereabouts over the last two years. However, 'A' returns, blowing up the Cavanaugh house and leaving the liars more afraid than ever. With Alison back, Aria, Emily, Hanna and Spencer notice how their friendship has changed since Ali's disappearance. The other residents in Rosewood also deal with Alison coming home, and it leads to Mona making an army against her, consisting of residents whom Ali bullied back in the day. The liars try to figure out who killed Mrs. DiLaurentis, and if there is a connection between her and the girl who was buried in Alison's grave, Bethany Young.

With Alison back, Hanna starts to have an identity crisis, and it progresses when Caleb comes back from Ravenswood and Alison moves into the Marin house. Struggling with guilt after realizing Shana was not 'A', Aria gets help from Ezra, and slowly starts to reconcile with him. Aria also begins to volunteer at Radley in order to find out information about Bethany Young, who was a patient there. Tension begins to swarm between her and Hanna when Hanna almost reveals what happened in New York to the new girl at school, Sydney. Emily tries to deal with her breakup with Paige, while struggling with her feelings toward Alison. She also helps the new girl, Sydney, with her swimming, until she finds out that Sydney knows Jenna. Meanwhile, Spencer deals with her parents splitting up and finding out what Melissa knows about the night Alison disappeared. Following several leads to find out more about Bethany, she learns that Mrs. DiLaurentis had spent some time with her. Furthermore, Melissa reveals that she was the one who buried Bethany because she was trying to protect Spencer, believing that Spencer killed the girl.

As the season progresses, the four girls begin to feel uncertain about Alison and whether she is telling them the truth, and Alison begins to lose their trust. The friendship hits a breaking point when Ali has to identify her so-called "kidnapper", and the girls realize that Alison has lied to them the entire time she has been back. They ultimately decide that she can't be trusted anymore. They then set up a plan to confess everything to the police. However, 'A' stops them before they can go through with the plan, and the liars find out that Alison has gone rogue. Teaming up with Mona, they discover that the police suspect Spencer of killing Bethany Young, and that Mrs. DiLaurentis had an affair with Bethany Young's father. After telling the girls she thinks that Alison is 'A', Mona is approached by 'A' and presumed dead in the ensuing confrontation. Spencer is arrested for Bethany's murder.

The Liars and their allies relentlessly pursue evidence to prove Alison killed Mona. Through the clues Mona left for them, they were able to get Alison charged and arrested for both Mona and Bethany's murders, clearing Spencer of the charges in the process. However, the girls realize someone is still helping Alison, who they now believe was trying to drag them down with her in jail. Their initial suspect is Detective Holbrook, but Holbrook reveals to Hanna that Alison cut him off. Their next suspect is Mike, Aria's brother, who has been secretly visiting Alison in jail. Mike eventually reveals to Aria that Mona was working with 'A' to have Alison arrested by faking her death, although the actual possibility that Mona may be dead remains unknown.

Realizing that Alison is innocent, the girls decided to work on proving Ali's innocence without incriminating Mike. However, Hanna becomes a suspect in Mona's murder, and is arrested after her blood is found on Mona's clothes. Aria, Spencer, and Emily, along with Ezra and Caleb, try to get any evidence that could help Alison and Hanna, though 'A' keeps on getting one step ahead of them. Mike considers taking the stand on Alison's trial; while Caleb agrees with Mike, Aria and Ezra convince him otherwise. Alison's trial ends with her being found guilty on Mona's murder, and subsequently, Aria, Spencer, and Emily are arrested as accessories. After being kidnapped by 'A' on their way to the prison, Hanna, Aria, Spencer and Emily awaken in a dollhouse lair, with rooms designed to look like their bedrooms with surveillance. They discover that Mona had indeed faked her death; however, she is going under the name Alison in the presence of 'A'. They attempt to leave during the "prom" 'A' forces them to create. Spencer then learns A's name: Charles, who is the oldest child of Kenneth and Jessica DiLaurentis. Upon managing to escape the dollhouse, they learn that they are surrounded by an electric fence and therefore trapped.

Cast

Main cast 
 Troian Bellisario as Spencer Hastings
 Ashley Benson as Hanna Marin
 Tyler Blackburn as Caleb Rivers1
 Lucy Hale as Aria Montgomery
 Ian Harding as Ezra Fitz
 Laura Leighton as Ashley Marin
 Shay Mitchell  as Emily Fields
 Janel Parrish as Mona Vanderwaal
 Sasha Pieterse as Alison DiLaurentis

Recurring cast 
 Keegan Allen as Toby Cavanaugh
 Lesley Fera as Veronica Hastings
 Lindsey Shaw as Paige McCullers
 Roma Maffia as Lieutenant Linda Tanner
 Cody Allen Christian as Mike Montgomery
 Drew Van Acker as Jason DiLaurentis
 Brandon W. Jones as Andrew Campbell
 Chloe Bridges as Sydney Driscoll
 Miranda Rae Mayo as Talia Mendoza
 Melanie Moreno as Cindy
 Monica Moreno as Mindy
 Torrey DeVitto as Melissa Hastings
 Nolan North as Peter Hastings
 Brendan Robinson as Lucas Gottesman
 Jim Abele as Kenneth DiLaurentis
 Sean Faris as Detective Gabriel Holbrook
 Will Bradley as Johnny Raymond

Guest cast 
 Holly Marie Combs as Ella Montgomery
 Jake Weary as Cyrus Petrillo
 Tammin Sursok as Jenna Marshall
 Andrea Parker as Jessica DiLaurentis
 Lauren Tom as Rebecca Marcus
 Chad Lowe as Byron Montgomery
 Aeriél Miranda as Shana Fring
 Brant Daugherty as Noel Kahn
 Edward Kerr as Ted Wilson
 Steve Talley as Zack
 Vanessa Ray as CeCe Drake
 Reggie Austin as Eddie Lamb
 Luke Kleintank as Travis Hobbs
 Ambrit Millhouse as Big Rhonda
 Sydney Penny as Leona Vanderwaal
 Charles Carpenter as James Neilan
 Elizabeth McLaughlin as Lesli Stone
 Oliver Kieran-Jones as Colin
 Christopher Grove as Douglas Sirk
 Austin Lyon as Matt
 Nia Peeples as Pam Fields
 Jim Titus as Officer Barry Maple
 Roark Critchlow as Tom Marin
 Paloma Guzmán as Jackie Molina
 John O'Brien as Arthur Hackett
 Meg Foster as Carla Grunwald
 Sara Shepard as Herself
 Isabella Rice as Young Alison DiLaurentis
 Wyatt Hodge as Little Charles
 Danielle Macdonald as Cathy

: Tyler Blackburn is credited as a series regular from episode 5 onward.

Episodes

Specials

Production

Development
The show was renewed for a fifth season on March 26, 2013, while in its third season. I. Marlene King announced on Twitter that the fifth season would contain 25 episodes, including a Christmas special instead of a Halloween episode, which the last three seasons have had. Right before the season five premiere aired, on June 10, 2014, the series was renewed for two additional seasons through season 6 and 7, making the show ABC Family's longest running original series.

On October 13, 2014, it was announced that the special Christmas episode would air as part of ABC Family's "25 Days of Christmas" programming event on December 9, 2014. ABC Family announced that they would air a special behind-the-scenes halloween episode where the cast of Pretty Little Liars would be interviewed and answering questions from fans. It was announced that the show would return with its winter premiere and remaining 12 episodes, which began airing on January 6, 2015.

Casting

The fifth season had nine roles receiving star billing, with all of them returning from the previous season, seven of which was part of the original cast from the first season. The season saw the four protagonists of the series continue the roles. Troian Bellisario played Spencer Hastings, who struggles with family drama. Ashley Benson continued her role as Hanna Marin, whom finds herself in an identity crisis as a result of Alison's return. Lucy Hale played Aria Montgomery who volunteers to work at Radley Sanitarium in addition to build up her relationship with Ezra. Shay Mitchell portrayed Emily Fields who is affected the most of Alison's return, which makes her confront her feelings towards Ali. Sasha Pieterse returned as Alison DiLaurentis, who moves back home after being presumably dead the last two years, which makes her the attention of the town. Janel Parrish played Mona Vanderwaal, who starts a group against Alison. Tyler Blackburn returned to the series as Caleb Rivers after playing the same character on Ravenswood, while Ian Harding continued his role as Ezra Fitz who is almost killed after being shot in the abdomen by Shana. In addition, Laura Leighton played Ashley Marin, Hanna's mom.

On March 12, 2014, it was announced that Tyler Blackburn would be returning as a series regular on the show after leaving halfway through the fourth season for the sister show; Ravenswood, and would return in the 100th episode. It was reported that in the season premiere, a beloved character would be in great danger as of the casting of a paramedic and two surgeons for the first episode. It was reported that Kenneth DiLaurentis would be returning, King said "Her father comes home and wants to take her with him". On April 3, 2014, it was reported that Chloe Bridges was cast as Sydney, the newest member on the swim team who would befriend Shay Mitchell's character Emily. She appeared in multiple episodes, the first being the third episode.

Tammin Sursok was reported to return to the show in the 100th episode. Her character hadn't been seen since the ninth episode of season four. TV Line reported on June 26, 2014, that Mona's mother, Leona, was going to be introduced in the summer finale, and was going to be played by Sydney Penny. On August 5, 2014, it was announced that Will Bradley was cast as Johnny Raymond, a new painter who would be spending some time with the character Spencer Hastings. He first appeared in the 15th episode. Author of the book series creator, Sara Shepard was announced to appear the show as the news reporter in the 24th episode, following her appearance in the first season episode "The Homecoming Hangover" as the Rosewood High School substitute teacher.

Broadcast
In Australia, the season premiered on Fox8 on June 13, 2014. The second part premiered on January 9, 2015. In the United Kingdom, the first part was released on Netflix on January 1, 2015, with new episodes streaming from the day after it airs in the US.

Reception

Critical reception
The season premiere was down from the previous premiere, and down from the season four finale 'A' Is for Answers", with a 1.1 at the target 18–49 demographic and 2.72 total viewers. On Rotten Tomatoes the fifth season got a rating of 80% fresh based on 5 reviews.

Live + SD ratings

DVD release

References

2014 American television seasons
2015 American television seasons
Pretty Little Liars (franchise)